The Whitehaven by-election of 18 June 1959 was held after the death of Labour Member of Parliament (MP) Frank Anderson on 25 April the same year. The seat was retained by Labour.

Results

References

Whitehaven by-election
Whitehaven by-election
Whitehaven by-election
20th century in Cumberland
By-elections to the Parliament of the United Kingdom in Cumbria constituencies